Legum Doctor (Latin: “teacher of the laws”) (LL.D.) or, in English, Doctor of Laws, is a doctorate-level academic degree in law or an honorary degree, depending on the jurisdiction. The double “L” in the abbreviation refers to the early practice in the University of Cambridge to teach both canon law and civil law (Doctor of both laws), with the double “L” itself indicating the plural, although Cambridge now gives the degree the name Doctor of Law in English. This contrasts with the practice of the University of Oxford, where the degree that survived from the Middle Ages is the DCL or Doctor of Civil Law (only).

European and Commonwealth usage 
In the United Kingdom, Australia, New Zealand, and a number of European countries, the LL.D. is a higher doctorate usually awarded on the basis of exceptionally insightful and distinctive publications that contain significant and original contributions to the study of law.  In South Africa, the LL.D. is awarded by many university law faculties as the highest degree in law, also based upon research and completion of a Ph.D. equivalent dissertation as in most European countries; see Doctor of Law in South Africa. The LL.D. may also be awarded as an honorary degree based upon a person's contributions to society.

Most Canadian universities that award the degree of Doctor of Laws (LL.D.) award it only as an honorary degree, but typically when awarded by a law school, it is an earned degree.  Of the universities in Canada that offer earned doctorates in law, five Francophone or bilingual universities (Université de Sherbrooke,  University of Ottawa, University of Montreal, Laval University, and University of Quebec at Montreal) offer the LL.D.

Lakehead University in Ontario, Canada, is one place that awards this popular honorary doctorate. At Lakehead it is regarded as the most appropriate award for a person distinguished in general service to the state, to learning and to mankind.

Germany 
Germany, as in many other continental European countries, does not distinguish between PhD and LL.D. academic degrees. German universities award the doctoral degree in law as a "Doctor of Law" (Dr. iur.) instead of a PhD, which literally means "Doctor of Philosophy" (Dr. phil.), and is traditionally reserved for doctoral dissertations in the field of social and political sciences. The degree of Dr. iur. usually requires independent academic research of up to 4 years. The doctor of law as an honorary degree is called "doctor iuris honoris causa" (Dr. iur. h.c.). The German academic system also knows a form of higher doctorate in law which is awarded after completion of a second dissertation (Habilitation) and is a prerequisite to teach law at (German) universities. The completion of the habilitation is indicated by adding "habil." to the title (Dr. iur. habil.).

Most German doctoral degrees in law are awarded as "Doktor der Rechte", "Doktor des Rechts" or "Doktor der Rechtswissenschaft" and would be abbreveated in the Latin form as "Dr. iur." or "Dr. jur.". If the dissertation is in the area of church laws, traditional universities may award the very rare degree of "Doktor beider Rechte" translating to doctor of both laws (Latin form: "doctor iuris utriusque" or "Dr. iur. utr."), emphasizing that the doctoral degree is in worldly and religious laws.

Malta 
In Malta, the European Union's smallest member state, the LL.D. was a doctorate-level academic degree in law requiring at least three years of post-graduate full-time study at the University of Malta, Malta's national university. At least three years of previous law study were required for entry. Students were required to complete coursework in a number of core areas of law, as well as to submit a thesis which is to be "an original work on the approved subject or other contribution to the knowledge showing that he/she has carried out sufficient research therein". It confers the title of Doctor, which in Malta is used to address a holder of the degree. Up until 2014, the LL.D. was one of the requirements for admission to the profession of advocate in Malta (an advocate, as opposed to a legal procurator, has rights of representation in superior courts).

Practicing lawyers are of three designations – notary, legal procurator and advocate. The Bachelor of Laws (LL.B.) degree is an undergraduate degree that of itself is not sufficient for admission into any of the legal professions. A one-year full-time taught post-graduate diploma of Notary Public (N.P.) is required after the LL.B. for admission to the profession of notary public, while a taught post-graduate diploma of Legal Procurator (L.P.) is required for admission to the profession of legal procurator. A legal procurator has rights of audience in the lower courts, a profession that was existent in Malta as early, and even prior to 1553. All three designations also require members to be holders of a warrant issued by the president of Malta, obtainable after examination, as well as a minimum of one year of work experience in that profession. It is not possible for a Maltese lawyer to hold a warrant in more than one of the professions at a time.

As of 2014 changes to the law course resulted from the implementation of the Bologna Process, removed the Doctorate of Laws (LLD) title and replace it with a second cycle degree, Master of Advocacy (M.Adv). This raised discussion as to whether newly qualified lawyers would be referred to as 'Doctor', as had been the norm. Following representation from law student organisations, the Chamber of Advocates came to the agreement that if a newly qualified lawyer was to self-stylize as 'Doctor' they would be supported, as a matter of convention. 

Notable holders of the LL.D. degree include Ugo Mifsud Bonnici, Guido de Marco, George Borg Olivier, and Lawrence Gonzi.

South Africa

United Kingdom and Ireland 
In the UK and Republic of Ireland, the degree of Doctor of Laws is a higher doctorate, ranking above the PhD, awarded upon submission of a portfolio of advanced research.  It is also often awarded honoris causa to public figures (typically those associated with politics or the law) whom the university wishes to honor.  In most British and Irish universities, the degree is styled "Doctor of Laws" and abbreviated as LLD; however, some universities (such as Oxford) instead award the degree of Doctor of Civil Law, abbreviated as DCL.

In former years, Doctors of Law were a distinct form of Attorney-at-Law who were empowered to act as advocates in the ecclesiastical, probate and admiralty courts. The Doctors had their own Inn, which was called Doctors' Commons. Charles Dickens spent some of his youth working in this branch of the law. The last surviving member of Doctors' Commons, Dr Thomas Tristram, wrote the first editions of a textbook on trusts still in use today. In 1954, a case was brought under long-dormant law in the High Court of Chivalry.  The opening arguments in that case were by George Drewry Squibb, who was simultaneously distinguished as a barrister, a doctor of laws, and a historian. Squibb argued, to the satisfaction of the court, that since the modern class of Doctors of Laws were no longer trained as advocates, their role must necessarily be performed by barristers. This was because Victorian reforms, which had unified the other classes of court attorney into the single profession of Barrister, had overlooked the Doctors of Law.

United States 
In the United States of America, the LL.D. is awarded as an honorary degree only.  The terminal academic law degree is the Scientiae Juridicae Doctor (S.J.D. or J.S.D.), equivalent to the Ph.D.

At the University of Kansas the LLD is awarded for notable service to humanity or the professions or contributions to the general welfare of the state, the nation, or the world. 

The University of Washington also gives this degree for recognition to those who have made profound and enduring contributions to scholarship, culture, and improved quality of life in society at large in the area of Law, public policy, and public service.

See also 
 Doctor of Philosophy (Ph.D.)
 Doctor of Juridical Science (S.J.D. or J.S.D.)
 Doctor of both laws (D.J.U.)
 Juris Doctor (J.D.)
 Master of Laws (LL.M.)
 Bachelor of Laws (LL.B.)
 Doctor of Canon Law (J.C.D.)

References

Laws
Law degrees
Higher doctorates
Honorary degrees